Guam National Olympic Committee (IOC code: GUM) is the National Olympic Committee representing Guam.

See also
Guam at the Olympics

References 

Guam
Guam at the Olympics
Oly
1976 establishments in Guam

Sports organizations established in 1976